Acrotriche depressa, commonly known as wiry ground-berry or honeypots, is a flowering plant in the family Ericaceae. It is a small shrub with crowded greyish-green leaves and white or green flowers and grows in southern Australia.

Description

Taxonomy and naming
Acrotriche depressa was first formally described in 1810 by Robert Brown and the description was published in Prodromus florae Novae Hollandiae. The specific epithet (depressa) means "depressed" referring to its growth habit.

Distribution and habitat
Honeypots grows in sclerophyll forest on a variety of soils, including loam, basalt, granite and sandy soil in Victoria, Tasmania, South Australia, Australian Capital Territory and New South Wales.

References

depressa
Ericales of Australia
Bushfood
Flora of South Australia